Prestige is a 1932 American pre-Code drama film directed by Tay Garnett and written by Tay Garnett, Rollo Lloyd and Francis Edward Faragoh. The film stars Ann Harding, Adolphe Menjou, Melvyn Douglas and Guy Bates Post. The film was released on January 22, 1932, by RKO Pictures.

Plot

Cast
Ann Harding as Therese Du Flos
Adolphe Menjou as Capt. Remy Bandoin
Melvyn Douglas as Capt. Andre Verlaine
Ian Maclaren as Colonel Du Flos 
Guy Bates Post as Major
Rollo Lloyd as Capt. Emil de Fontenac
Clarence Muse as Nham
Tetsu Komai as Sergeant

Production 
Although Melvyn Douglas recalled decades later that he was called in to replace Adolphe Menjou (who appears in the film), Turner Classic Movies states that Variety reported he replaced originally cast Robert Williams who had died of peritonitis on November 3, 1931 resulting from a ruptured appendix. Douglas claimed that Ann Harding was so unhappy with the picture that she asked the studio "to let her buy the negative and destroy it because she feared it was so bad."

Release
Prestige became available on DVD in October 2013, through a Spanish distributor.

References

External links
 

1932 films
1932 drama films
American black-and-white films
American drama films
1930s English-language films
Films about alcoholism
Films directed by Tay Garnett
Films set in prison
Films set in the French colonial empire
Films shot in Florida
RKO Pictures films
Films scored by Arthur Lange
1930s American films
Films with screenplays by Francis Edward Faragoh